Albert J. Salvi (born April 25, 1960) is an American attorney, politician, and former radio talk show host. Salvi served as a member of the Illinois House of Representatives and was a Republican nominee for the United States Senate and Illinois Secretary of State. He is the managing partner of the Illinois law firm Salvi & Maher, a personal injury law firm with offices in Waukegan, Chicago, Richmond and Wheaton. Salvi has been practicing law for 37 years, and is considered one of the nation's top attorneys by the National Association of Distinguished Counsel (NADC).

Early life and education 
Salvi was born into a large family, well known for their success in law and music. He was raised in Lake Zurich, Illinois.

Salvi received his Bachelor of Arts in government from the University of Notre Dame in 1982 and his J.D. from the University of Illinois College of Law in 1985. He was admitted to the Illinois State Bar Association the same year. He was also admitted to the State Bar of California in 1987 and became licensed in Wisconsin in 2015.

Career 
In 1986, Salvi ran for the United States House of Representatives in Illinois's 19th congressional district, but lost to Terry L. Bruce.

Salvi was elected to the Illinois House of Representatives in 1992, representing the 52nd district, which was based in western Lake County. Salvi served as Representative until 1996, when he left his seat to run for the U.S. Senate seat being vacated by two-term Democrat Paul Simon. In his Senate run, Salvi defeated Lieutenant Governor Bob Kustra in the Republican primary, but was defeated by U.S. Representative Dick Durbin in the general election.

In 1998, Salvi ran for Illinois Secretary of State. Though he defeated State Representative Robert W. Churchill in the Republican primary, he lost in the general election to Democrat Jesse White.

Salvi has donated to several other conservative candidates, including Alan Keyes, Dan Quayle, and Peter Roskam.

Salvi is a personal injury attorney and a partner in the law firm Salvi & Maher. He handles cases such as automobile accident injuries, slip and fall, medical malpractice, personal injury, dog bites, and litigation.

Salvi was the host of The Al Salvi Show, an issues-oriented radio talk show which aired on WKRS AM 1220 in Waukegan, Illinois, when this station aired a news-talk format. In 2006, Salvi left his radio show on WKRS to further pursue his legal career.  He was replaced in the 10 AM to Noon time slot by Bruno Behrend, another WKRS radio host.  In 2007, Salvi temporarily returned to WKRS and was on the air two days a week.

Electoral history 
 1998 Secretary of State election
 Jesse White (D),  1,874,626, 55.46%
 Al Salvi (R),  1,437,420, 42.53%
 Sandra Millatti (RF),  67,696, 2%
 1998 Secretary of State Republican primary
 Al Salvi,  365,880, 53.0%
 Robert W. Churchill,  324,529, 47.0%
 1996 U.S. Senate election
 Dick Durbin (D),  2,384,028,  56.09%
 Al Salvi (R),  1,728,824, 40.67%
 Steven H. Perry (Ref),  61,023,  1%
 Robin J. Miller (Lbt),  41,218 1%
 1996 Republican Primary for U.S. Senate
 Al Salvi,  377,141,  48%
 Bob Kustra,  342,935,  43%
 Robert Marshall,  43,937,   6%
 Martin Paul Gallagher,  17,276,   2%
 Wayne S. Kurzeja,   10,356,   1%
 1994 Illinois House of Representatives election, District 52
 Al Salvi (R),  20,947, 79.47%
 Jayna Ashbacher (D),  5,410,  20.53%
 1992 Illinois House of Representatives election, District 52
 Al Salvi (R),  31,817, 100%

Notes

External links 
 Chicago Tribune articles on Salvi
 

|-

Illinois lawyers
Republican Party members of the Illinois House of Representatives
University of Notre Dame alumni
University of Illinois College of Law alumni
People from Evanston, Illinois
1960 births
Living people
People from Lake Zurich, Illinois